Genevieve Beacom (born 30 October 2004) is an Australian baseball pitcher who in 2022 became the first woman to pitch in the Australian Baseball League. Beacom made her debut on 8 January 2022 for the Melbourne Aces in a game against the Adelaide Giants. Beacom stated she intends on coming to the United States to play college baseball for 2023.

Biography
Genevieve Beacom was born on 30 October 2004 to her father Brendan. Growing up, Beacom watched her brother, Sam Trend-Beacom, play baseball, and started herself playing Tee-ball at a young age. Beacom played one year of softball, which she stated she "hated". In 2018, she struck out seventeen batters in a youth women's competition. She was the first woman selected to the Baseball Victoria under-16 team, and was the first female pitcher for the Victorian Summer Baseball League; she pitched to a 0.00 earned run average in the under-16 tournament, which consisted of the best 200 players in Australia. She played in the 2019 Australian Youth Championships.

Beacom signed with the Melbourne Aces of the Australian Baseball League (ABL) around 1 January 2022 as a development player without pay so as to not interfere with her eligibility to play college baseball in the United States. Beacom made her ABL debut against the Adelaide Giants on 8 January 2022 for the Aces, where she pitched one inning, allowing one walk and no hits as the Aces lost 7–1. When she made her debut, she became the first woman to pitch in the ABL. Beacom stated she that intends to travel to the United States to play college baseball in 2023.

Personal life
Beacom's brother Sam played college baseball for Lower Columbia College in Longview, Washington. In an interview with MLB Network in January 2022, she stated her favourite baseball team is the Atlanta Braves, and her favourite player is Gerrit Cole.

References

Living people
2004 births
Australian female baseball players
Baseball pitchers
Melbourne Aces players